Lynn Rapu Tuki (born in Rapa Nui - Easter Island, Chile, in 1969), head-teacher and founder of the Ma'aranui Cultural Academy and the Cultural Ballet Kari Kari, is an active promoter of the arts and traditions of the Rapa Nui People. He is Cultural Ambassador of Asia-Pacific and has been Head of the Liaison Office of the National Council of Culture and the Arts (CNCA, Consejo Nacional de la Cultura y las Artes, in Spanish).

Childhood 
Several major events back in the 1960s changed the course of the Island, which began revolving around the ever-growing touristic market. These events include the social movement led by Alfonso Rapu in 1964, the enactment of "Ley Pascua". in 1966 in answer to the rebellion and the opening of the Mataveri International Airport later that same year, which meant a raise and perpetuation of the touristic flow.

This inflection point in the History of Rapa Nui translated in an impact both in their trade and their culture, being the later the most affected by foreign influence, which gave diversity to the native music. Dr. Ramón Campbell, in his book "La Herencia Musical de Rapa Nui" (The Musical Heritage of Rapa Nui) states "When I arrived on the Island (1964) there was still native music left and the musical traditions had been kept intact, without contamination from overseas which came with the tourist invasion from the main land in 1966 thanks to air travel being more available." Page 10.

Lynn Rapu was born on Easter Island in 1969, son of Belisario Rapu Hito and Analola Tuki Teave. He is part of a generation that, compared to their elders, grew up with much more freedom and access to income produced by touristic activity.

With the passing of his father in 1977 while his mother was abroad, Lynn and his siblings were sent to live in a local Children's Home for 5 years. During this period, his cultural education was strongly associated with people like Papiano Ika -who lived in "La Colonia" Sanatorium, for people with Hansen's disease-, Luis Pate Paoa (known as Kiko Pate) and Ricardo Hito.

At the age of 15 years old he began his career as a performance in a dance troupe formed by his brother Marcos Rapu, called Arangi Moana, mainly in the musical part executing instruments like the ukulele and percussion. Later in 1992, enters another group called Pokutangi as a musician and dancer for 4 years; it is in this experience when he decides to renounce the troupe and establish an academy focused on transmitting the essence of culture through discipline.

Contributions

Ma'aranui Academy and the Cultural Ballet Kari Kari 
Created the cultural academy back in 1996, where he teaches free classes in music, dance, native language, ancestral navigation principles, customs and crafts of Rapa Nui. It has formed recognized artist of the ethnic group, winners of the Tapati Rapa Nui festival and participants of various folkloric troupes. In the same year the Cultural Ballet Kari Kari is founded, a traditional troupe with a long history in the island and with international presence.

Representative 

Because of his knowledge on culture and ancient customs, Lynn usually represents and directs social and cultural events such as: wakes, church songs, family gatherings, social parties, receptions, among others. Some of the most important activities where he has been in charge are the reception of Polynesian double hulled canoes such as Hokule'a in 2017, cultural exchanges abroad and winner for 17 consecutive years as a director of dance troupes for the Tapati Rapa Nui festival

Other Projects 
In 1998, while running the Academy and the dance troupe, he began teaching Culture Courses in the local school Lorenzo Baeza Vega. He usually taught these classes outside the classroom. This course included Rapa Nui Language, traditional fishing, and music, amongst others. He stopped giving this class in school in 2004.

In 2011 he was named Cultural Ambassador of the Asia-Pacific, and was legal representative of the Rapa Nui Culture abroad. While he carried out his functions, he gave the opportunity to various music and dance troupes from the island to take part in several cultural exchanges throughout Polynesia and was able to get young Rapanui people to participate as crew members of Polynesian canoes such as Vaka Fa'afaite and Te Aurere. He took part in the Forum: “Reflexiones desde la Experiencia Maori” (“Thoughts from the Maori Experience”) in the Universidad de Chile. Later on, in 2016-2017, he was named Head of the Liaison Office in the Consejo Nacional de la Cultura y las Artes, on Easter Island.

Debut 
Even though the Ma’aranui Academy was created back in 1996, it was not until 1997 that the Cultural Ballet Kari Kari gave their first performance as a troupe. This first performance took place in Hotel Iorana, on Rapa Nui.  It was not long until they began touring outside the island. Their most outstanding performances so far have been (in chronological order):

Discography 
The Cultural Ballet Kari Kari have their own discography, which comprises different ancient songs.

Certificates

References

Bibliography 
 Campbell, R. (2015). La Herencia Musical de Rapa Nui. Rapanui Press.

External links 
 Web review

1969 births
Living people
Chilean schoolteachers
20th-century Chilean educators
21st-century Chilean educators
Easter Island people